Lyne Bessette (born 10 March 1975, Lac Brome, Quebec) is a politician and retired professional bicycle racer from Quebec, Canada. She was elected to represent the riding of Brome—Missisquoi in the 2019 federal election as a member of the Liberal Party of Canada.

Bessette was a member of the Canadian Olympic team in 2000 and 2004. She won the Tour de l'Aude Feminin in 1999 and 2001 and the Women's Challenge in 2001.

Bessette was the pilot for para-cyclist and para-nordic skier Robbi Weldon's gold medal wins at the 2012 Summer Paralympics Women's road race B and 2010 Union Cycliste Internationale (UCI) World Para-cycling Championships. Even though she retired from professional bike racing in 2006, in 2018, she was appointed Garneau ambassador.

Bessette declined to seek re-election in July 2021 ahead of the year's federal election.

Bessette was inducted into the FQSC hall of fame in November 2022

Record of achievements

1999
20th Time Trial UCI Road World Championships
7th Tour de Suisse Feminin
2nd Prologue
6th Stage 3, Göschenen to Göscheneralp time trial
3rd Stage 4, Embrach to Embrach
1st Mountains Jersey (QOM)
2nd Killington Stage Race
2nd Stage 1, Brandon Gap Road Race
5th Stage 2, Rutland Criterium
6th Stage 3, Saab Road Race
2nd GP Feminin du Quebec
1st Stage 2, Lac Brome Road Circuit Race
1st Stage 3, Sutton Road Circuit Race
4th Stage 4, Bedford Road Circuit Race
1st Stage 5, Brigham Time Trial
5th Stage 6, Cowansville Criterium
2nd Pan American Games Time Trial
Women's Challenge (2.9.1)
2nd Stage 5, Sun Valley Circuit Race
2nd Stage 12, Statehouse Criterium
2nd Montreal (Can) World Cup
1st Tour de l'Aude (2.9.1)
5th Prologue, Gruissan time trial
4th Stage 2, Rieux Minervois
3rd Stage 5, Castelnaudary time trial
2nd Stage 6a, Mazamet to Pic de Nore
8th Stage 6b, Pradelles Cabardes to Mazamet
2nd Stage 8a, Quillan to Matemale
4th Stage 8b, Matemale to Quillan
1st Tour of Willamette
3rd Prologue Time Trial
2nd Stage 1, Hinman Vineyards Road Race
3rd Stage 3, Brownsville Road Race
3rd Stage 4, Time Trial
2nd Sea Otter Classic
3rd Stage 1, time trial
3rd Stage 3, circuit race
1st Redlands Bicycle Classic
3rd QOM
2nd Stage 1
4th Stage 2

2000
2nd Killington Stage Race
2nd Points Classification
3rd Stage 1, Brandon Gap Road Race
4th Stage 2, Rutland Criterium
3rd Stage 3
4th GP Féminine International du Québec (2.9.2)
2nd Points Classification
2nd Mountains Classification
2nd Stage 1, Farnham to Farnham
1st Stage 3, Richford to Lac Brome
6th Stage 4, Bedford Time Trial
5th Stage 6, Sutton to Mount Sutton
1st Tour de 'Toona
2nd Stage 1, Altoona Time Trial
1st Stage 3, Hollidaysburg Circuit Race
1st Stage 5, Verizon Circuit Race
2nd Stage 6, Downtown Altoona Criterium
5th Stage 1, Blue Cosmos Design Time Trial, Wendy's International Cycling Classic
1st Fitchburg Longsjo Classic
3rd Stage 1, Royal Plaza Time Trial
4th Stage 2, Aubuchon/Gudden Road Race
1st Stage 3, Unitil/FG&E Road Race
10th Stage 4, Downtown Criterium
Women's Challenge
10th Stage 4, Rupert to Pomerelle
7th Stage 5, Burley South Individual Time Trial
10th Stage 6, Burley to Buhl
12th Montreal (Can) World Cup
10th Tour de l'Aude
8th Prologue, Gruissan Time Tria;
10th Stage 2a (Rieux-Minervois to Pic de Nore
2nd Stage 4 (Port Lauragais to Port Lauragais
8th Stage 5 (Castelnaudary Time Trial
3rd Tour of Willamette
2nd Prologue, Skinner's Butte Time Trial
1st Stage 1, Greenhill Road Race
9th Stage 2, Smith River Road Race
3rd Stage 3, Kill Hill Road Race
3rd Stage 4, Coburg Time Trial
3rd Stage 6, Brownsville Road Race
5th Sea Otter Classic
4th Prologue (Laguna Time Trial)
2nd Redlands Bicycle Classic
2nd Climber's Classification
4th Prologue, San Bernardino Street Sprints
2nd Stage 1, East Highlands Circuit Race
3rd Stage 2, East Highlands Time Trial
7th Stage 3, Lake Matthews to Oak Glen Road Race
Sequoia Cycling Classic
5th Rocky Hill Road Race
McLane-Pacific Bicycle Classic
6th Merced Downtown Criterium
8th Foothills Road Race

2001
12th UCI rankings
Tour de Suisse Féminin (2.9.1)
2nd Stage 1 (Sarnen Time Trial)
9th Stage 2 (Sarnen)
3rd, Overall, GP Féminin International du Canada (2.9.2)
10th, Stage 1 (Farnham to Farnham)
6th, Stage 2 (Frelighsburg)
1st, Stage 3 (Richford to Lac Brome)
1st, Stage 4 (Bedford Time Trial, 19.1 km)
3rd, Stage 6 (Sutton to Mont-Sutton)
10th, Timex International Women's Open
Tour de 'Toona
2nd, Stage 1, Time Trial
1st, Stage 2
8th, Stage 3
1st  Canadian National Time Trial Cycling Championships
1st  Canadian National Road Race Cycling Championships
1st BMC Software Tour of Arlington
1st Fitchburg-Longsjo Classic
1st Stage 1, Time Trial
2nd Stage 2, Circuit Race
2nd Stage 3, Road Race
4th Stage 4, Criterium
1st Women's Challenge (2.9.1)
1st Points Classification
2nd Mountains Classification
4th Sprints Classification
2nd Stage 1, Boise to Idaho City
2nd Stage 3, Stanley to Ketchum
1st Stage 4, Sun Valley Time Trial, 5.1 km
2nd Stage 5, Elkhorn Resort Circuit Race
10th Stage 6, Shoshone to Burley
2nd Stage 7, Burley to Pomerelle
5th Stage 8, Burley to Magic Mountain
1st Stage 9, Twin Falls to Buhl
1st Stage 11, Emmett to Firebird Time Trial, 21 km
6th Stage 12, Idaho Statehouse Criterium
3rd, Montréal (Can) World Cup
1st Tour de l'Aude (2.9.1)
2nd Points Classification
1st Mountains Classification
5th Sprints Classification
6th Prologue, Gruissan Time Trial, 3 km
7th Stage 1, Coursan to Coursan
2nd Stage 2, Rieux Minervois to Rieux Minervois
8th Stage 5, Castelnaudary Time Trial, 26.5 km
2nd Stage 6, Castelnaudary to Castelnaudary
5th Stage 7a, Castelnaudary to Bram
4th Stage 7b, Bram to Limoux
2nd Stage 9, Limoux to Limoux
3rd Tour of the Gila
3rd Stage 1, Tyrone Time Trial, 15.7 miles
2nd Stage 2, Silver City to Mogollan Road Race
2nd Stage 3, Inner Loop Road Race) - 2nd place
4th Stage 4, Downtown Silver City Criterium
3rd Stage 5, Gila Monster Road Race
Redlands Bicycle Classic (2.9.2)
2nd Stage 1, Mt. Rubidoux Time Trial, 5 km
3rd Stage 2, Highland Road Race
Sequoia Cycling Classic
1st Rocky Hill Road Race
4th Visalia Criterium
1st Stage 2, Foothills Road Race, McLane-Pacific Grand Prix

2002
20th UCI Rankings
13th GP Suisse (Swi) féminin World Cup
3rd Canadian National Time Trial Championships
6th Canadian National Road Race Championships
3rd Time Trial, Commonwealth Games
7th Road Race, Commonwealth Games
1st Fitchburg Longsjo Classic
1st Sprints Classification
1st Stage 1, Royal Plaza Time Trial
1st Stage 2, Circuit Race
1st Stage 3, Wachusett Mountain Road Race
5th Women's Challenge (2.9.1)
8th Stage 2, Lowman to Stanley
5th Stage 3, Stanley Time Trial, 40 km
3rd Stage 5, Shoshone to Pomerelle
5th Stage 6, Burley to Magic Mountain
4th Stage 8, Idaho Statehouse Criterium
5th Le Tour du Montréal (2.9.2)
4th Stage 1, Lachine Time Trial, 3 km
2nd La Flèche Wallonne (Bel) World Cup
6th Montréal (Can) World Cup
4th Damesronde van Drenthe (1.9.1)
2nd Overall, Solano Bicycle Classic
1st Stage 1, Lagoon Valley Road Race
2nd Stage 2, Montezuma Hills Time Trial
1st Sea Otter Classic
3rd Stage 1, Laguna Seca time trial, 27.2 km
5th Stage 2, Cannery Row Criterium
3rd Stage 3, Fort Ord Road Race
1st Stage 4, Laguna Seca Circuit Race
4th Redlands Bicycle Classic
3rd QOM Classification
3rd Stage 1, Mt. Rubidoux Time Trial
1st Stage 2, Highland Circuit Race
5th Stage 3, Oak Glen Road Race
4th Stage 4, Beaver Medical Group Criterium
2nd Stage 5, Sunset Road Race
Sequoia Cycling Classic
2nd, Rocky Hill Road Race
10th Visalia Criterium
McLane-Pacific Bicycle Classic
2nd Stage 1, Merced Downtown Criterium
1st Stage 2, McLane-Pacific Road Race

2003
1st International Tour de Toona
2nd Tour de l'Aude Cycliste Féminin

2004
1st Nature Valley Grand Prix
1st International Tour de Toona
16th Summer Olympics Time Trial

2006
1st New England Championship Cyclo-Cross Series (NECCS) Round #6, W.E. Stedman Grand Prix

2007
1st Female Age  30-39 Paris to Ancaster 14th Annual Classic

2015
 1st Female Gaspesia 100 MTB Marathon - 50 miles

2016
 1st Female Gaspesia 100 MTB Marathon - 100 miles (1st Female to complete a 100 miles mtb race in Quebec.

2017
 1st Female Gaspesia 100 MTB Marathon - 100 miles
 10th Gran Prix of Gloucester, Day 2
 1st Female  Triathlon CanadaMan Xtri World tour du Lac Mégantic

2018 

 1st Female Triathlon CanadaMan Xtri  World tour du Lac Mégantic

2019 
2nd Female Triathlon CanadaMan Xtri  World tour du Lac Mégantic

2021 
2nd Female Triathlon CanadaMan Xtri World tour du Lac Mégantic
First female to complete the Gravel Bike Packing Challenge 500 (Team)

2022 
2nd female Gaspesia 100 - 100k ultra-trail
1st female  Gravel Bike Packing Challenge 500 Solo (23h17min)

Electoral record

References

External links
A fan site in French
A brief biography on Canoe

1975 births
Living people
Canadian female cyclists
Cyclists at the 1999 Pan American Games
Cyclists from Quebec
Commonwealth Games gold medallists for Canada
Commonwealth Games bronze medallists for Canada
Pan American Games silver medalists for Canada
Commonwealth Games medallists in cycling
Pan American Games medalists in cycling
Cyclists at the 1998 Commonwealth Games
Cyclists at the 2002 Commonwealth Games
Members of the House of Commons of Canada from Quebec
Liberal Party of Canada MPs
Women members of the House of Commons of Canada
21st-century Canadian politicians
21st-century Canadian women politicians
Canadian sportsperson-politicians
Olympic cyclists of Canada
Cyclists at the 2000 Summer Olympics
Cyclists at the 2004 Summer Olympics
Medalists at the 1999 Pan American Games
People from Sutton, Quebec
Medallists at the 1998 Commonwealth Games
Medallists at the 2002 Commonwealth Games